David LeRoy Anderson  is an American makeup artist who has won two Academy Awards for Best Makeup, first was at the 69th Academy Awards for the film The Nutty Professor, then the following year at the 70th Academy Awards for Men in Black. Both wins were shared with Rick Baker.
He received his 3rd Oscar nomination at the 2005 ceremony for the film Cinderella Man, a nomination he shared with his father,  Lance Anderson.

Personal life
David LeRoy Anderson is married to Heather Langenkamp, best known for her acting work in A Nightmare on Elm Street, and together they own a visual effects studio named AFX Studio. They have two children, Daniel Atticus and Isabelle Eve. On January 10, 2018, Anderson and Langenkamp's son, Daniel, died at the age of 26 from brain cancer.

References

External links

American make-up artists
Living people
Best Makeup Academy Award winners
Best Makeup BAFTA Award winners
Year of birth missing (living people)
Place of birth missing (living people)